The Eremita de San Jordi or Eremita de San Jorge or Hermitage of St George is a Roman Catholic rural chapel or hermitage located just outside the town of El Puig in the province of Valencia, Spain.

History
This hermitage was erected in 1631 to celebrate the 1237 Battle of El Puig and the legendary intervention of St George in favor of the Aragonese forces History. This victory by Jaime I de Aragón opened the way for his conquest of Valencia. The interior has mosaic designs celebrating the battle. The chapel was restored in 1926 with an elaborate ceremony.

References

Baroque architecture in the Valencian Community
17th-century Roman Catholic church buildings in Spain
Roman Catholic churches completed in 1631
Churches in the Valencian Community
1631 establishments in Spain